Guine Bissau Airlines was an airline in Guinea-Bissau. It was founded in 2002 and disestablished again in 2003.

References

Airlines established in 2002
2002 establishments in Guinea-Bissau